"Something Fishy" is a song written and recorded by American singer-songwriter Dolly Parton. It was released as a single on May 8, 1967, by Monument Records. It would be included on Parton's 1967 debut album, Hello, I'm Dolly. The song peaked at number 17 on the Billboard Hot Country Singles chart, becoming Parton's first top 20 hit.

Critical reception
Billboard gave a positive review of the song, calling it "clever material...performed to perfection." They predicted that it would "fast top her "Dumb Blonde" hit and establish her as one of the label's consistent top sellers." In another positive review, Cashbox said it "could be another chart item for Parton." They described "Something Fishy as "a bright, bouncy side" with a cute treatment from Dolly," while calling "I’ve Lived My Life" a "feelingful tale of woe."

Commercial performance
"Something Fishy" debuted at number 61 on the Billboard Hot Country Singles chart. It would eventually peak at number 17 and spend 12 weeks on the chart.

Track listing
7" single (Monument 45-1007)
"Something Fishy"  – 2:06
"I've Lived My Life"  – 2:35

Charts

References

1966 songs
Dolly Parton songs
Monument Records singles
Song recordings produced by Fred Foster
Songs about infidelity